Article 35A of the Indian Constitution was an article that
empowered the Jammu and Kashmir state's legislature to define "permanent residents" of the state and provide special rights and privileges to them. It was added to the Constitution through a  presidential order, i.e., The Constitution (Application to Jammu and Kashmir) Order, 1954 – issued by the President of India under Article 370. The state of Jammu and Kashmir defined these privileges to include the ability to purchase land and immovable property, ability to vote and contest elections, seeking government employment and availing oneself of other state benefits such as higher education and health care. Non-permanent residents of the state, even if Indian citizens, were not entitled to these 'privileges'.

The provisions facilitated by the Article 35A and the state's permanent resident laws have been criticised over the years for their discriminatory nature, including the hardships imposed on immigrant workers, refugees from West Pakistan, and the State's own female residents, who could lose their permanent resident status by marrying out of state.

On 5 August 2019, the President of India Ram Nath Kovind issued a new Presidential Order, whereby all the provisions of the Indian Constitution were made to apply to the State without any special provisions. This implied that the State's separate Constitution stood inoperative, including the privileges allowed by the Article 35A.

Background 
Prior to 1947, Jammu and Kashmir was a princely state under the British Paramountcy. The people of the princely states were "state subjects", not British colonial subjects. In the case of Jammu and Kashmir, the political movements in the state in the early 20th century led to the emergence of "hereditary state subject" as a political identity for the State's people. In particular, the Pandit community had launched a "Kashmir for the Kashmiris" movement demanding that only Kashmiris should be employed in state government jobs. Legal provisions for the recognition of the status were enacted by the Maharaja of Jammu and Kashmir between 1912 and 1932. The 1927 Hereditary State Subject Order  granted to the state subjects the right to government office and the right to land use and ownership, which were not available to non-state subjects. 

With the 1927 order, one could become a state subject under class III after 10 years of permanent residence. Another order was given on June 27th 1932, which reiterated the 10 year demand for "foreign nationals".

Following the accession of Jammu and Kashmir to the Indian Union on 26 October 1947, The Maharaja ceded control over defence, external affairs and communications (the 'ceded subjects') to the Government of India . The Article 370 of the Constitution of India and the concomitant Constitutional Order of 1950 formalised this relationship. Discussions for furthering the relationship between the State and the Union continued, culminating in the 1952 Delhi Agreement, whereby the governments of the State and the Union agreed that Indian citizenship would be extended to all the residents of the state but the state would be empowered to legislate over the rights and privileges of the state subjects, who would now be called permanent residents.

In his statement to the Lok Sabha on the Delhi agreement, Nehru has said:The question of citizenship arose obviously. Full citizenship applies there. But our friends from Kashmir were very apprehensive about one or two matters. For a long time past, in the Maharaja's time, there had been laws there preventing any outsider, that is, any person from outside Kashmir, from acquiring or holding land in Kashmir. If I mention it, in the old days the Maharaja was very much afraid of a large number of Englishmen coming and settling down there, because the climate is delectable, and acquiring property. So although most of their rights were taken away from the Maharaja under the British rule, the Maharaja stuck to this that nobody from outside should acquire land there. And that continues. So the present Government of Kashmir is very anxious to preserve that right because they are afraid, and I think rightly afraid, that Kashmir would be overrun by people whose sole qualification might be the possession of too much money and nothing else, who might buy up, and get the delectable places. Now they want to vary the old Maharaja's laws to liberalise it, but nevertheless to have checks on the acquisition of lands by persons from outside. However, we agree that this should be cleared up. The old state's subjects definition gave certain privileges regarding this acquisition of land, the services, and other minor things, I think, State scholarships and the rest.

So, we agreed and noted this down: 'The State legislature shall have power to define and regulate the rights and privileges of the permanent residents of the State, more especially in regard to the acquisition of immovable property, appointments to services and like matters. Till then the existing State law should apply.'
Following the adoption of the provisions of the Delhi Agreement by the Constituent Assembly of Jammu and Kashmir, the President of India issued The Constitution (Application to Jammu and Kashmir) Order, 1954, through which Indian citizenship was extended to the residents of the state, and simultaneously the Article 35A was inserted into the Indian constitution enabling the State legislature to define the privileges of the permanent residents.

Text
"Saving of laws with respect to permanent residents and their rights. — Notwithstanding anything contained in this Constitution, no existing law in force in the State of Jammu and Kashmir, and no law hereafter enacted by the Legislature of the State:

(a) defining the classes of persons who are, or shall be, permanent residents of the State of Jammu and Kashmir; or

(b) conferring on such permanent residents any special rights and privileges or imposing upon other persons any restrictions as respects— 
(i) employment under the State Government;
(ii) acquisition of immovable property in the State; 
(iii) settlement in the State; or 
(iv) right to scholarships and such other forms of aid as the State Government may provide,

shall be void on the ground that it is inconsistent with or takes away or abridges any rights conferred on the other citizens of India by any provision of this part."

Enactment 
The Constitution (Application to Jammu and Kashmir) Order, 1954 was issued by President Rajendra Prasad under Article 370, with the advice of the Union Government headed by Jawaharlal Nehru. It was enacted as a subsequent to the '1952 Delhi agreement', reached between Nehru and the then Prime Minister of Jammu and Kashmir Sheikh Abdullah, which dealt with the extension of Indian citizenship to the Jammu and Kashmir "state subjects".

The state was empowered, both in the Instrument of Accession and the Article 370, to decree exceptions to any extension of the Indian Constitution to the state, other than in the matter of ceded subjects. So Article 35A wa seen as an exception authorised by the Article 370, clause(1)(d).

Bakshi Ghulam Mohammad of the Jammu and Kashmir National Conference was the Prime Minister of Jammu and Kashmir at the time of the 1954 Presidential order.

Permanent Residents
The Jammu and Kashmir Constitution, which was adopted by the Jammu and Kashmir Constituent Assembly on 17 November 1956, defined a Permanent Resident (PR) of the state as a person who was a state subject on 14 May 1954, or who has been a resident of the state for 10 years, and has "lawfully acquired immovable property in the state". The Jammu and Kashmir state legislature could alter the definition of permanent residents or modify the privileges applicable to them through a law passed with two-thirds majority.

The State Constituent Assembly incorporated these discriminatory provisions under Section 51 (Qualifications for membership of the Legislature – "A person shall not be qualified to be chosen to fill a seat in the Legislature unless he is a Permanent Resident of the State"), Section 127 (Transitional provisions – "Until other provision is made in this behalf under this Constitution, all the laws in force immediately before the commencement of this Constitution and applicable to any public service or any post which continues to exist after the commencement of this Constitution, as service or post under the State, shall continue in force so far-as consistent with the provisions of this Constitution") and Section 140 ("The elections to the Legislative Assembly shall be on the basis of adult suffrage; that is to say, every person who is a permanent resident of the State and who is not less than Eighteen years of age on such date ..."), etc.

As a result of  these provisions, no person who was not a Permanent Resident of Jammu and Kashmir could own property in Jammu and Kashmir, obtain a job in the Jammu and Kashmir Government, join any professional college run by government of Jammu and Kashmir, or get any form of government aid from government funds.

Revocation of special status and domicile law 
On 5 August 2019, the Union Government revocated the special status granted to Jammu and Kashmir under the Article 370 through a Presidential Order, and made the entire Constitution of India applicable to the state. This implied that the Article 35A stood abolished. Further, the Union Parliament passed legislation reorganising the state into two union territories, one being Jammu and Kashmir, the other Ladakh.

The union territory of Jammu and Kashmir continued under the old laws until 31 March 2020, while being under President's Rule. On 31 March, the Union Ministry of Home Affairs (Department of Jammu, Kashmir and Ladakh Affairs) passed the Jammu and Kashmir Reorganisation (Adaptation of State Laws) Order, 2020, repealing 29 state laws and amending 109 laws of Jammu and Kashmir.
Among the amended laws is the Jammu and Kashmir Civil Services (Decentralization and Recruitment) Act 2010.  References to "permanent resident of the State" in the Act were substituted by the new concept of "domicile" in the union territory.

According to the order any person who has stayed in Jammu and Kashmir for 15 years or has studied for a period of seven years and appeared in Class 10th/12th examination in the territory will be deemed to have domicile in Jammu and Kashmir. Children of central government officials and others who have served in Jammu and Kashmir for a period of 10 years and their children also have domicile status.
A person registered as a migrant by the Relief and Rehabilitation Commissioner (Migrants) can also apply for domicile benefits.

Text of the order:

In the original Order of 31 March, only subordinate posts in the Jammu and Kashmir government were reserved for domiciled residents. The higher level posts were made available to outsiders. Following protests and criticism, a Second Order was issued on 3 April 2020, reserving all posts of Jammu and Kashmir to domiciled residents. A new order on 19 May called the Jammu and Kashmir Grant of Domicile Certificate (Procedure) Rules 2020 was passed.

See also 
Article 370 of the Constitution of India
 Constitution of Jammu and Kashmir
 Instrument of Accession (Jammu and Kashmir)
 Kashmir conflict
 Political integration of India

Notes

References

Bibliography
 
 
 
 
 

035
Law of India
Jammu and Kashmir
History of the Republic of India
1947 establishments in India